Leone may refer to:

Geography
Leone, American Samoa
Monte Leone, mountain in the Leone-Gruppe as part of Western Alps
Sierra Leone, independent nation in West Africa

Leone as a given name 
 Leone Battista Alberti (1404–1472), Italian Renaissance humanist polymath
 Léone Boudreau-Nelson (1915-2004), American-born Canadian phonetician
 Leone Caetani (1869–1935), Italian politician
 Leone de' Sommi (c. 1525–c. 1590), Italian writer
 Leone N. Farrell (1904–1986), Canadian biochemist and microbiologist
 Leone Ginzburg (1909–1944), Italian journalist
 Leone Leoni (1509–1590), Italian Renaissance sculptor and medallist
 Léone-Noëlle Meyer (born 1939), French businesswoman and philanthropist
 Leone Minassian (1905–1978), Ottoman Empire-born Italian painter of Armenian descent
 Leone Ross (b. 1969), British writer, editor, journalist and academic
 Leone Sforza (1406–1440), Italian condottiero
 Leone Strozzi (1515–1554), Italian condottiero

Leone as a surname 
Brad Leone (b. 1985), American chef and YouTube personality
Carl Leone (b. 1976), Canadian businessman and criminal
 Cinzia Leone (b. 1959), Italian actress and comedian.
 Dominic Leone (born 1990), American baseball player
 Douglas Leone (b. 1957), American billionaire venture capitalist
 Gabriele Leone (c.1735–1790) Italian mandolin virtuoso
 Giacomo Leone (b. 1971), Italian long-distance runner
 Giovanni Leone (1908–2001), Italian politician who served as president and prime minister
 Giuseppina Leone (b. 1971), Italian athlete
 Jason Leone, former drummer for Michigan heavy metal band Battlecross
 Matthew Leone (b. 1981), bassist of Madina Lake and twin of Nathan Leone
 Miriam Leone (b. 1985), Italian television personality and beauty pageant titleholder
 Nathan Leone (b. 1981), lead singer of Madina Lake and twin of Matthew Leone
 Richard Leone (1940–2015), American politician
 Rob Leone, (b. 1976), Canadian politician
 Sergio Leone (1929–1989), Italian film director
 Sunny Leone (b. 1981), Indo-Canadian model and actress

Other
 Leone, a character in the opera Tamerlano of Handel
 Leone-class destroyer an Italian Navy destroyer class
 Aerfer Leone, undeveloped fighter aircraft
 Pastiglie Leone, maker of candies and lozenges
 Subaru Leone, subcompact car
 Sierra Leonean leone, currency of Sierra Leone
 Leone, a character in the manga and anime series Akame ga Kill!
 Leone Abbacchio, an ex-police officer and main character in the manga and anime series JoJo’s Bizarre Adventure: Golden Wind
 The Leone Crime Family, a fictional Italian American mafia from GTA III and GTA Liberty City Stories

Italian masculine given names
Italian-language surnames